David Carlos Teles Veloso (born October 28, 1988), simply known as David Bala, is a Brazilian professional footballer who currently plays as a forward for Hong Kong First Division League club Central & Western.

External links

References

1988 births
Living people
Brazilian footballers
Brazilian expatriate footballers
Expatriate footballers in Vietnam
Expatriate footballers in Thailand
Expatriate footballers in Indonesia
Expatriate footballers in Hong Kong
Brazilian expatriate sportspeople in Hong Kong
V.League 1 players
David Bala
David Bala
Girabola players
Liga 1 (Indonesia) players
Hong Kong Premier League players
Becamex Binh Duong FC players
G.D. Interclube players
David Bala
David Bala
David Bala
David Bala
David Bala
Hong Kong Rangers FC players
Association football forwards